Nagraj is a fictional superhero appearing in Raj Comics.

Nagraj, Nagaraj, or Nagaraja may also refer to:
 Nagaraj, an Indian given name and surname
 Nagaraja, an Indian mythical figure
 Nagaraja (World of Darkness), creatures in the role-playing game Vampire: The Masquerade
 Nagaraja Temple, Nagercoil, an Indian Hindu temple in Tamil Nadu, India
 Nagraj (film), a 2018 Indian Bhojpuri action drama film

See also
 
 
 
 Nagara (disambiguation)
 Naga (disambiguation)
 Nagar (disambiguation)
 Nagarajan (disambiguation)